Ulle Veliye is a 1993 Indian Tamil-language crime film directed by Parthiban and produced by Seetha. The film stars Parthiban, Aishwarya and Shenbagam. It was released on 16 April 1993. The film proved to be a successful venture at the box office in spite of its vulgar scenes and double-entendres. The film was remade in Hindi as Mr. Azaad (1994).

Plot 
Gajendran is a small-time crook who lives in a slum. In the past, his father was a laborer and a communist activist. His superior killed his father, and his innocent mother Rajalakshmi was sent to jail for her husband's murder. Gajendran was then born in jail. Being born in jail, he is treated as a crook by society and he decides that if that is what they want him to be, he will be one. He will do anything for money. Gajendran takes the IPS exam as a joke, cheats and passes it. He becomes a police officer again cheating his way through the training and other aspects but then takes bribes from everyone, even the poor. He is reformed when one of the honest constables, on the day of retirement, loses his life trying to stop a jail break which he could have easily ignored. On the same day, anti-corruption officers raid Gajendran's house and find a lot of money there. At the court, Shenbagam, who is deeply in love with Gajendran, decides to save him, so she lies to the judge that she was a prostitute and had earned a lot of money. She then commits suicide. This reforms him and makes him realizes that all actions have consequences.

Thereafter, he falls in love with the police officer Meena. Later, MLA Muthulingam burns Gajendran's slum to collect some votes. Gajendran marries Meena and finally decides to fight against the corruption and in the end, kills them all unable to render justice legally.

Cast 

Parthiban as R. Gajendran alias Gaja
Aishwarya as Meena
Shenbagam as Shenbagam
Rajeev as Muthulingam
R. N. Sudarshan as Rajarathnam
Thalapathi Dinesh
Captain Raju
Sabitha Anand as Rajalakshmi
Vennira Aadai Moorthy as Constable
Silk Smitha
Dakshayini as Selvi
MRK
Oru Viral Krishna Rao as Constable
Mannangatti Subramaniam as Constable
Thideer Kannaiah
Joker Thulasi
Karuppu Subbiah
Azhagu

Production 
According to Parthiban, his "clean" film Sugamana Sumaigal (1992) was rejected by audiences, prompting him to make the more vulgar Ulle Veliye to compensate for the losses incurred from the previous film.

Soundtrack 
The soundtrack was composed by Ilaiyaraaja, with lyrics written by Vaali, Gangai Amaran and Pulamaipithan. For the Telugu-dubbed version Allari Donga, all lyrics were written by Rajasri.

Tamil version

Telugu version

Reception 
The Indian Express wrote, "Parthiban gives a good account of himself and as a director and story writer too he has excelled but as a dialogue writer he has gone overboard with the double entendres and conceived situations which are obscene".

Impact 
Parthiepan said in 2019 that the then recently released Ayogya, an official remake of Temper (2015) was in fact lifted from Ulle Veliye; nevertheless, he decided not to file a lawsuit as he only wanted to alert fans and make them compare both films.

References

External links 
 

1990s Tamil-language films
1993 crime films
1993 films
Fictional portrayals of the Tamil Nadu Police
Films directed by R. Parthiban
Films scored by Ilaiyaraaja
Indian crime films
Tamil films remade in other languages